Maktorion or Mactorium, was an ancient town of Sicily, in the neighborhood of Gela, mentioned by Herodotus (vii. 153), who tells us that it was occupied by a body of Geloan citizens, who were driven out from their country, and were restored to it by Telines, the ancestor of Gelon. The name is also found in Stephanus of Byzantium (s. v.), who cites it from Philistus, but no mention of it occurs in later times. The only clue to its position is that afforded by Herodotus, who calls it a city above Gela, by which he must mean further inland. Cluverius conjectures that it may have occupied the site of Butera, a town on a hill about 13 km inland from Gela, (Cluver. Sicil. p. 363), the editors of the Barrington Atlas of the Greek and Roman World place Maktorion at the ruins and archaeological site at Monte Bubbonia in the modern comune of Mazzarino, Province of Caltanissetta.

References

Ancient cities in Sicily
Ruins in Italy
Ancient Greek archaeological sites in Italy
Former populated places in Italy